A second stage manufacturer, known in the industry as "bodybuilder," builds such products as bus and truck bodies, ambulances, motor homes, and other specialized vehicles. 

Neither their product, nor the first stage portion, called an incomplete motor vehicle, are fully compliant with all of the requirements for a complete motor vehicle without the other . 

Cutaway van chassis are one of the more popular incomplete motor vehicles for second stage manufacturers to use as a platform for their products. A large portion of small school buses, minibuses, and recreational vehicles are based upon cutaway van chassis.

School buses
Trucks
Recreational vehicle manufacturers